Pennsylvania Route 43 may refer to:
U.S. Route 22 in Pennsylvania, which was signed in some segments as Pennsylvania Route 43 in the 1920s and 1930s.
Schuylkill Expressway, which was signed as Pennsylvania Route 43 in the 1950s and 1960s, currently signed as part of Interstate 76.
Mon–Fayette Expressway, which currently uses the Pennsylvania Route 43 designation in its non-tolled sections.